Pierre Declercq (May 10, 1938 - September 19, 1981) was a French New Caledonian politician and a noted supporter of New Caledonian independence.

Declercq was born in Halluin, Nord, Metropolitan France. He moved to New Caledonia to become a teacher in the 1960s. Later going into politics, he became secretary of the Caledonian Union. The President of the Republic met with him and other members of the CU on 19 September 1981.  He was assassinated in his house in Nouméa  not long after. His killers have never been apprehended.

References

External links
  Il y a vingt ans, le secrétaire général de l'Union Calédonienne était assassiné Pierre Maillot's article on the amnistia.net website

1981 deaths
Assassinated New Caledonian politicians
Caledonian Union politicians
1938 births
New Caledonian people of French descent